Ciudades Desiertas (Empty cities or Deserted Cities) is a 1982 novel written in Spanish by José Agustín.  It is a mature work set in a small city in the United States around the early 1980s.

Plot summary

Ciudades Desiertas  is the story of Susana, a female Mexican writer fleeing her home to attend an international workshop in the United States, leaving her husband Eligio behind and completely unaware of her whereabouts. A hot-tempered intellectual with a somewhat cynical and misanthropic sense of humor, he works his way to catch up with his wife, arguing to have only done so to find out why exactly Susana left.

The book's title seems to be derived from the couple's separate observations in regards to the apparent lack of movement around Arcadia, where the workshop takes place. They almost immediately suffer a cultural shock upon their arrival, although they are already well acquainted with the typical American lifestyle. The American residents, with a small town mentality, are depicted as largely more ignorant of the visitors' culture and society; whereas the latter, especially Latin Americans, show a contemptuous reluctance to try and fit in, perhaps Susana being the most remarkable exception. Throughout their journey, both try to pinpoint their relationship's setbacks, as well as their own flaws.

The two attempt to show a sense of individuality and emotional disattachment from their spouse, each according to their respective point of view. While Eligio tries to make sense out of things, halfway acknowledging the extent of his feelings for his wife, still paradoxically giving in to outbursts of rage on occasions; Susana strains to convey an ideal of utter independence, as she feels the routine of her marriage holds her back. Motivated at first to prove her own self-worth, which she does find, she eventually experiences the certainty of her love for Eligio, in spite of all her efforts to stay away from him.

Relationship between Mexico and the USA
Susana and Eligio criticize each other throughout the novel for characteristics that they have in common.  Eligio, for example, is bothered by Susana's feminist traits, while Susana constantly points out Eligio's macho attitude – a term whose connotation is stronger than the word “chauvinist.”  Implicitly, one of their greatest complaints is that the other person is more interested in their self.  An example of this is the opinions that they have toward the respective times that they spend with each other's incompetent friends.  Also, both accuse each other of seeking self-autonomy even though they are married; however, even though they want independence, they search for each other in different countries, and both seem to accept their spouse after being abandoned.  Eligio condemns his wife for having a relationship with Slawomir and then has a relationship with one of the authors.  The ultimate paradoxical representation is presented in the last chapter when he spanks his wife after she returns to Mexico.  The comical action and the submissive behavior are contrary to both characters.

Feminism 
José Agustín uses the idea of feminism to create interaction among characters in Ciudades Desiertas.  Susana is in a relationship with Eligio, and at one point Susana tries to express herself openly about societal issues.  Eligio then hits her as a means to control her due to his machismo on-look he learned from Mexico.  Many Latin American societies in the past set norms for women, and felt it was out of place that women talk back or give their opinion.  Women did not have the right to express concerns about aspects that occurred within their society.  Using contemporary writing, Agustín is able to show a reader the thought and opinions of women through character interaction.  The world has changed, and Latin American countries have to realize that.  Women have to adapt their role within society as a means to survive where there is a need that they must work outside the home to help support the family.  Culturally, countries get set in their ways and forget that the world is a different place than it was in the past.  Women, such as Susana, must be able to voice their opinion because they too can help a country to better economically just as men can.  It may be difficult for Eligio, and other men in Latin American countries to accept change, but women too our people that should be respected and that can have an impact.  Agustín shows that the tension between men and women exits today because men feel they are losing control.  Feminism helps to argue women are not objects, and that they are people who deserve respect and have an impact in society.  In conclusion, the role of women is changing to meet the changes of a new and modernizing world, and Latin American countries must accept that.

Literary significance and criticism
In this book, the term "machismo" seems to be a territorial term. That is, it is only effective in certain situations and certain territories. Eligio, the traditional “machista”, finds himself struggling to rescue his wife. After arriving to the United States, Susana seems to reverse roles; she gains more independence making her less dependable on Eligio. This is something very different from what used to happen in their native country of Mexico. Back home, Eligio was able to suppress his companion with his “machista” traits. He would drink all the time and ignore Susana's complaints. All these bad treatments were allowed because of his material and emotional control. This attitude forced Susana to depart toward the U.S. There, she reverses the roles, when Eligio arrives, she is now in control, she owns her own place, she has no dependence on him, rather, he is the one staying in her property and obeying her rules. Also, her emotional side seems to be filled by another participant of the program she attends, Slawomir. As a result, Eligio is no longer needed for emotional purposes. This situation and control is challenged by his “machista” husband; who tries to employ the same “machista” attitude to get her back on his side. Nevertheless, he fails due to his territorial powers. He is no longer the nucleus of the relation. In the United States Susana has no dependency on him; she can live fine with or without him. Consequently, Eligio chooses to return to his native land. His “machismo” dies in the United States, and it is only revived, at the end, once they both return to Mexico. It is a way to show the differences that exist between American and Mexican culture.

References

1982 novels
Novels by José Agustín